Massie is a surname sometimes derived from the Scottish clan name Matheson, and may refer to:

 Alex Massie (disambiguation) 
 Allan Massie (born 1938), Scottish journalist and novelist
 Bob Massie (born 1947), Australian cricketer
 Edward Massie (1619–1674), English Parliament soldier in the English Civil War
 Elizabeth Massie, American author
 Gordon Massie, Canadian politician and activist with Communist Party of Canada (Ontario)
 Hugh Massie (Hugh Hamon Massie 1854–1938), Australian cricketer
 Jack Massie (Robert John Allwright Massie 1890–1966), Australian cricketer
 John Massie (1842-1925), British theologian and politician
 Joseph Massie (economist) (died 1784), British political economist
 Joseph Massie (American football) (1871–1922), American football player and coach
 Matthew (born 1985) and Nicholas Massie (born 1989), American professional wrestlers collectively known as The Young Bucks
 Nathaniel Massie (1763–1813), American early Ohio Country frontier surveyor
 Robert K. Massie (1929–2019), American historian
 Robert Lee Massie (1941–2001), American convicted murderer executed in California
 Rev. Robert Kinloch Massie (born 1956), American author
 Thalia Fortescue Massie (1911–1963), the figure at the centre of a Hawaiian murder trial
 Thomas Massie (born 1971), American politician
 Thomas Leeke Massie (1802–1898), admiral in the British Navy

See also 
Masih (surname)
Massey (surname)
Massey (disambiguation)

Scottish surnames